Abyssotrophon soyoae is a species of sea snail, a marine gastropod mollusk in the family Muricidae, the murex snails or rock snails.

Distribution
Okinawa Trough.

Ecology
It was recorded 1973 m deep.

References

Abyssotrophon
Gastropods described in 1959